Noviny pod Ralskem is a municipality and village in Česká Lípa District in the Liberec Region of the Czech Republic. It has about 300 inhabitants.

Geography
Noviny pod Ralskem lies in the Ralsko Uplands.

Sights
On the Ralsko mountain there is a ruin of a Gothic castle. It has been desolate since the 16th century.

References

Villages in Česká Lípa District